Ann Vermilion is an American politician and businesswoman serving as a member of the Indiana House of Representatives from the 31st district. She was appointed to the House on August 14, 2019, succeeding Kevin Mahan.

Education 
Vermilion graduated from Marion High School. She earned a Bachelor of Science degree in kinesiology and business from Indiana University Bloomington and a Master of Business Administration from Indiana University Kokomo.

Career 
Vermilion worked as an administrator at the Marion General Hospital before founding a healthcare consulting business. Vermilion was appointed to the Indiana House of Representatives in August 2019, succeeding Kevin Mahan. She also serves as vice chair of the House Family, Children and Human Affairs Committee. In February 2021, Vermilion was selected as the next president of the Political Organization for Women’s Education and Representation (POWER).

References 

Living people
Indiana University Bloomington alumni
Republican Party members of the Indiana House of Representatives
Women state legislators in Indiana
People from Marion, Indiana
Year of birth missing (living people)
21st-century American women